Open Doors is a 1990 Italian film directed by Gianni Amelio. Set in Palermo in the 1930s, a judge who is morally against the death penalty is confronted with the case of a man who has murdered his wife and two colleagues in cold blood. Opposed by both the fascist government - endorsing death penalty since it allows people to be safe to the point of "sleeping at night with open doors" - and public opinion, he struggles to do what he believes is right. Based on a 1987 novel, "Porte Aperte", by Leonardo Sciascia. The film was selected as the Italian entry for the Best Foreign Language Film at the 63rd Academy Awards.

Plot
The film opens with a Fascist bureaucrat, recently fired, killing the man who fired him, the man who replaced him, and his wife.

Cast
Gian Maria Volonté as Judge Vito di Francesco
Ennio Fantastichini  as  Tommasco Scalia
Renato Carpentieri as  Consolo
Tuccio Musumeci as  Spatafora
Silverio Blasi as  Attorney
Vitalba Andrea  as Rosa Scalia
Giacomo Piperno  as Prosecutor
Lydia Alfonsi  as  Marchesa Anna Pironti
Renzo Giovampietro  as President Sanna

Awards

Won
 1991 David di Donatello:
Best Actor - Gian Maria Volonté
Best Costume Design - Gianna Gissi
Best Film
Best Sound - Remo Ugolinelli
3rd European Film Awards:
Best Cinematography
Best Film
Discovery of the Year Award - Ennio Fantastichini
Italian Golden Globes:
Best Actor - Gian Maria Volonté 
Best Film
Best Screenplay
Italian National Syndicate of Film Journalists
Best Director
Best Supporting Actor - Ennio Fantastichini 
Montpellier Mediterranean Film Festival
Critics Award - Gianni Amelio 
Golden Antigone - Gianni Amelio

Nominated
 63rd Academy Awards:
Best Foreign Language Film
1991 David di Donatello:
Best Cinematography - Tonino Nardi
Best Director - Gianni Amelio
Best Editing - Simona Paggi
Best Producer - Angelo Rizzoli Jr.
Best Production Design - Amedeo Fago, Franco Velchi
Best Screenplay - Gianni Amelio, Vincenzo Cerami
Best Supporting Actor - Ennio Fantastichini
3rd European Film Awards:
Special Prize of the Jury - Gian Maria Volonté 
Italian National Syndicate of Film Journalists
Best Actor - Gian Maria Volonté 
Best Screenplay

See also
 List of submissions to the 63rd Academy Awards for Best Foreign Language Film
 List of Italian submissions for the Academy Award for Best Foreign Language Film

References

External links

1990 films
1990 drama films
Courtroom films
Films about capital punishment
Films based on Italian novels
European Film Awards winners (films)
Films based on works by Leonardo Sciascia
Films directed by Gianni Amelio
Films set in Sicily
Films set in the 1930s
Italian drama films
1990s Italian-language films
Films with screenplays by Vincenzo Cerami
1990s Italian films